Mark Zuckerberg book club (aka A Year of Books) was an online book club hosted by Mark Zuckerberg through his personal Facebook account started in January 2015. Zuckerberg made a book recommendation every two weeks for a year to his millions of Facebook followers.

Zuckerberg came up with the idea as part of his New Year's Resolution for 2015 after Cynthia Greco, the Audience Development Manager for MediaOnePA/York Newspaper Company, suggested that Zuckerberg read a new book every month. Zuckerberg modified the idea to one book every two weeks and books which "emphasize learning about new cultures, beliefs, histories and technologies."

Book club selections

Reception
The Atlantic wrote that it "has the potential to be Oprahesque in its influence on book sales", in reference to the Oprah Book Club after the first selection by Moisés Naím caused Amazon's stock to sell out. An article in The New Yorker made a similar comparison to Oprah. The Associated Press noted that the second selection by Steven Pinker did not result in any increase in sales according to Nielsen BookScan data.

References

External links
A Year of Books, official website
Announcement
Borrow these books from your local library

Book promotion
Awards established in 2015
Awards disestablished in 2015
2015 establishments in the United States
2015 disestablishments in the United States